The 2000 CFL Draft took place on Tuesday, April 18, 2000. 46 players were chosen for Canadian Football League teams from among the 504 eligible CIAU football players from Canadian universities, as well as Canadian players playing in the NCAA. Of the 46 draft selections, 22 players were drafted from Canadian Interuniversity Athletics Union institutions.

Trades
In the explanations below, (D) denotes trades that took place during the draft, while (PD) indicates trades completed pre-draft. This is a partial list due to references being limited.

Round one
 Montreal → Calgary (PD). Montreal traded a first-round selection and an undisclosed pick in the 2001 CFL Draft to Calgary in exchange for Ed Philion.
 Hamilton → Calgary (PD). Hamilton traded a first-round selection to Calgary in a trade for Chris Burns.

Round four
 BC → Winnipeg (PD). BC traded a fourth-round selection and Khari Jones to Winnipeg in exchange for Chris Perez.
 Winnipeg → Toronto (D). Winnipeg traded the 24th overall selection and Brad Elberg to Toronto in exchange for Dave Mudge.

Forfeitures
 Calgary forfeited their first round selection after selecting Wayne Blair in the 1999 Supplemental Draft.

Draft order

Round one

Round two

Round three

Round four

Round five

Round six

References

Further reading
 

Canadian College Draft
Cfl Draft, 2000